Grêmio Esportivo Glória, commonly referred to as Glória, is a Brazilian football club based in Vacaria, Rio Grande do Sul. It currently plays in Campeonato Gaúcho Série A2, the second level of the Rio Grande do Sul state football league.

History
The club was founded on November 15, 1956. They won the Campeonato Gaúcho Second Level in 1988 and Copa FGF in 2021.

Achievements

 Campeonato Gaúcho Second Level:
 Winners (1): 1988

 Copa FGF:
 Winners (1): 2021

Stadium
Grêmio Esportivo Glória play their home games at Estádio Altos da Glória. The stadium has a maximum capacity of 8,000 people.

References

Association football clubs established in 1956
Football clubs in Rio Grande do Sul
1956 establishments in Brazil